Autosphyla is a genus of moths in the family Lasiocampidae.

References

Lasiocampidae
Moth genera